Norassoba  is a town and sub-prefecture in the Siguiri Prefecture in the Kankan Region of northern Guinea.

References

Sub-prefectures of the Kankan Region